Aleysk is a town in Altai Krai, Russia, located on the Aley River (Ob's tributary),  southwest of Barnaul. Population:    32,000 (1968).

Administrative and municipal status
Within the framework of administrative divisions, Aleysk serves as the administrative center of Aleysky District, even though it is not a part of it. As an administrative division, it is incorporated separately as the town of krai significance of Aleysk—an administrative unit with the status equal to that of the districts. As a municipal division, the town of krai significance of Aleysk is incorporated as Aleysk Urban Okrug.

Military
The town was host to Aleysk air base, and a division of the Strategic Rocket Forces, the 41st Guards Rocket Division. Currently the 35th Separate Guards Motor Rifle Brigade of the 41st Combined Arms Army, Central Military District is located in Aleysk.

References

Notes

Sources

External links
Official website of Aleysk 
Directory of organizations in Aleysk 

Cities and towns in Altai Krai